Homalomena philippinensis is a species  of flowering plants in the family Araceae. It is native to the Philippines and Orchid Island in Taiwan. It grows at low elevations usually in forests and along bodies of water. It is commonly known as payau or payaw, alupayi or alopayi, salet, or tahig, among other names.

H. philippinensis is commonly grown as an ornamental plant. The petioles of the leaves have a sweet chewing gum scent when crushed. The leaves are used in Philippine folk medicine and for wrapping food in Philippine cuisine.

References

philippinensis
Flora of Mindanao
Garden plants of Asia
House plants
Flora of the Philippines
Flora of Taiwan